is a 2004 Japanese film directed by Ken Nikai, based on Ai Yazawa's manga of the same name.

Differences from the manga
 In the manga, there are four children who help Eve, they are: Hotaru Shiraishi (the only one able to see her in both the movie and the manga), Sae Kayama, Tetsu Sugisaki and Masaki Miura. While in the movie, only Masaki and Hotaru help her, but are later assisted by Tomoki.
 In the manga, Mizuki called a taxi to get to Adam before the last quarter of the moon fell, this is where she hears him play Last Quarter, on the radio of the taxi. While in the movie, she simply runs to where he is, and never hears him play on the radio.
 In the manga, Sayaka is 17 when she dies, Mizuki is 17 when she goes into the coma, and Mizuki's father/Adam gave her a ring (with the initials "S.K." imbedded inside it) for her 17th birthday. While in the movie, both girls were 19, and Tomoki/Adam gave a red gem necklace for their 18th birthday.
 Adam's last name is never mentioned in the movie, his grave simply says:
Rest in Peace, Adam.

So where do I sail?
A ship losing control.
My cries swallowed up, lost in the raging sea.

So where has love gone?
Will I ever reach it?
The Cape Of Storms echoes the pain I feel inside.
 Adam's last name is given in the manga as "Lang".

References

External links
 Official website (in Japanese)
 

Live-action films based on manga
2004 films
2000s Japanese-language films
2000s Japanese films